The 1996–97 Pittsburgh Penguins season was the team's 30th in the National Hockey League. This was the final season for Mario Lemieux before his first retirement.

Off-season

Regular season 
The 1996–97 season featured Mario Lemieux in his final season before his first retirement. Lemieux won his sixth (and final) Art Ross Trophy as the NHL's leading scorer, with 122 points. The Penguins had an up-and-down season en route to a sixth-place finish in the Eastern Conference. A 2–9–0 start was followed by a hot middle-of-the-season stretch, highlighted by the play of rookie phenom goaltender Patrick Lalime. A shoulder injury to Tom Barrasso ended his season after five unmemorable games and led to the promotion of Lalime from the Cleveland Lumberjacks of the International Hockey League (IHL). Lalime debuted in relief of Ken Wregget in a loss to the New York Rangers on November 16. His first win came in relief of Wregget on December 6, and the next day, on December 7, he was given the start against the Mighty Ducks of Anaheim, beating the Mighty Ducks and setting him well on his way to setting the NHL record for consecutive games unbeaten to begin a career for an NHL goaltender, going 14–0–2 (16 games). However, the Penguins cooled down after that, as the team did not win a road game after February 5, which led to a coaching change on March 4. Eddie Johnston was relieved of his duties as head coach after losing eight of his last nine games and was replaced on an interim basis by General Manager Craig Patrick. Patrick went 7–10–3 down the stretch, enough to get the Penguins into the playoffs as the sixth seed at 38–36–8. The Penguins finished the season first in scoring, with 285 goals for.
In the Eastern Conference Quarterfinals, the Penguins took-on the third-seeded Philadelphia Flyers. The Flyers dismantled the Penguins in five games en route to an Eastern Conference championship of their own. The Pens' lone win in the series was in Game 4 at the Civic Arena in Pittsburgh, in which Lemieux scored on a breakaway against Flyers goaltender Garth Snow in the closing minutes for his final goal before his first retirement.

Final standings

Schedule and results 

|-  style="background:#fcf;"
| 1 || 5 || Tampa Bay Lightning || 4–3 OT || Pittsburgh Penguins || 0–1–0 || 0
|-  style="background:#fcf;"
| 2 || 8 || Pittsburgh Penguins || 3–7 || Hartford Whalers || 0–2–0 || 0
|-  style="background:#fcf;"
| 3 || 11 || Pittsburgh Penguins || 2–3 || Ottawa Senators || 0–3–0 || 0
|-  style="background:#cfc;"
| 4 || 12 || Ottawa Senators || 2–3 || Pittsburgh Penguins || 1–3–0 || 2
|-  style="background:#fcf;"
| 5 || 16 || Pittsburgh Penguins || 1–8 || New York Rangers || 1–4–0 || 2
|-  style="background:#fcf;"
| 6 || 17 || Pittsburgh Penguins || 1–4 || Buffalo Sabres || 1–5–0 || 2
|-  style="background:#cfc;"
| 7 || 19 || Washington Capitals || 1–2 || Pittsburgh Penguins || 2–5–0 || 4
|-  style="background:#fcf;"
| 8 || 22 || Pittsburgh Penguins || 2–5 || Edmonton Oilers || 2–6–0 || 4
|-  style="background:#fcf;"
| 9 || 24 || Pittsburgh Penguins || 5–7 || Calgary Flames || 2–7–0 || 4
|-  style="background:#fcf;"
| 10 || 26 || Pittsburgh Penguins || 1–2 || Vancouver Canucks || 2–8–0 || 4
|-

|-  style="background:#fcf;"
| 11 || 1 || Pittsburgh Penguins || 2–4 || Washington Capitals || 2–9–0 || 4
|-  style="background:#cfc;"
| 12 || 2 || Ottawa Senators || 3–7 || Pittsburgh Penguins || 3–9–0 || 6
|-  style="background:#cfc;"
| 13 || 6 || Edmonton Oilers || 2–5 || Pittsburgh Penguins || 4–9–0 || 8
|-  style="background:#ffc;"
| 14 || 8 || Pittsburgh Penguins || 5–5 OT || Tampa Bay Lightning || 4–9–1 || 9
|-  style="background:#fcf;"
| 15 || 9 || Pittsburgh Penguins || 2–4 || Florida Panthers || 4–10–1 || 9
|-  style="background:#cfc;"
| 16 || 12 || Buffalo Sabres || 0–3 || Pittsburgh Penguins || 5–10–1 || 11
|-  style="background:#fcf;"
| 17 || 14 || Pittsburgh Penguins || 1–2 OT || Boston Bruins || 5–11–1 || 11
|-  style="background:#fcf;"
| 18 || 16 || New York Rangers || 8–3 || Pittsburgh Penguins || 5–12–1 || 11
|-  style="background:#cfc;"
| 19 || 19 || St. Louis Blues || 2–4 || Pittsburgh Penguins || 6–12–1 || 13
|-  style="background:#fcf;"
| 20 || 21 || Pittsburgh Penguins || 3–7 || Philadelphia Flyers || 6–13–1 || 13
|-  style="background:#cfc;"
| 21 || 22 || Pittsburgh Penguins || 7–1 || Hartford Whalers || 7–13–1 || 15
|-  style="background:#ffc;"
| 22 || 27 || Montreal Canadiens || 2–2 OT || Pittsburgh Penguins || 7–13–2 || 16
|-  style="background:#cfc;"
| 23 || 30 || Boston Bruins || 2–6 || Pittsburgh Penguins || 8–13–2 || 18
|-

|-  style="background:#ffc;"
| 24 || 3 || Hartford Whalers || 4–4 OT || Pittsburgh Penguins || 8–13–3 || 19
|-  style="background:#cfc;"
| 25 || 4 || Pittsburgh Penguins || 4–2 || Ottawa Senators || 9–13–3 || 21
|-  style="background:#cfc;"
| 26 || 6 || Pittsburgh Penguins || 5–3 || Washington Capitals || 10–13–3 || 23
|-  style="background:#cfc;"
| 27 || 7 || Mighty Ducks of Anaheim || 3–5 || Pittsburgh Penguins || 11–13–3 || 25
|-  style="background:#cfc;"
| 28 || 10 || Pittsburgh Penguins || 5–3 || Los Angeles Kings || 12–13–3 || 27
|-  style="background:#cfc;"
| 29 || 11 || Pittsburgh Penguins || 7–3 || Mighty Ducks of Anaheim || 13–13–3 || 29
|-  style="background:#cfc;"
| 30 || 13 || Pittsburgh Penguins || 4–0 || San Jose Sharks || 14–13–3 || 31
|-  style="background:#fcf;"
| 31 || 15 || Pittsburgh Penguins || 1–2 || Chicago Blackhawks || 14–14–3 || 31
|-  style="background:#fcf;"
| 32 || 17 || Boston Bruins || 6–4 || Pittsburgh Penguins || 14–15–3 || 31
|-  style="background:#cfc;"
| 33 || 19 || Pittsburgh Penguins || 4–0 || St. Louis Blues || 15–15–3 || 33
|-  style="background:#cfc;"
| 34 || 21 || San Jose Sharks || 1–3 || Pittsburgh Penguins || 16–15–3 || 35
|-  style="background:#cfc;"
| 35 || 23 || Pittsburgh Penguins || 6–5 || Toronto Maple Leafs || 17–15–3 || 37
|-  style="background:#ffc;"
| 36 || 26 || Montreal Canadiens || 3–3 OT || Pittsburgh Penguins || 17–15–4 || 38
|-  style="background:#cfc;"
| 37 || 28 || Buffalo Sabres || 0–2 || Pittsburgh Penguins || 18–15–4 || 40
|-  style="background:#cfc;"
| 38 || 30 || Washington Capitals || 3–5 || Pittsburgh Penguins || 19–15–4 || 42
|-

|-  style="background:#cfc;"
| 39 || 2 || Pittsburgh Penguins || 6–1 || New Jersey Devils || 20–15–4 || 44
|-  style="background:#cfc;"
| 40 || 4 || Tampa Bay Lightning || 3–7 || Pittsburgh Penguins || 21–15–4 || 46
|-  style="background:#cfc;"
| 41 || 7 || Pittsburgh Penguins || 5–3 || New York Islanders || 22–15–4 || 48
|-  style="background:#cfc;"
| 42 || 10 || New York Islanders || 2–5 || Pittsburgh Penguins || 23–15–4 || 50
|-  style="background:#ffc;"
| 43 || 11 || Pittsburgh Penguins || 3–3 OT || Ottawa Senators || 23–15–5 || 51
|-  style="background:#cfc;"
| 44 || 14 || Dallas Stars || 1–3 || Pittsburgh Penguins || 24–15–5 || 53
|-  style="background:#cfc;"
| 45 || 15 || Pittsburgh Penguins || 3–0 || Hartford Whalers || 25–15–5 || 55
|-  style="background:#cfc;"
| 46 || 21 || Calgary Flames || 2–4 || Pittsburgh Penguins || 26–15–5 || 57
|-  style="background:#fcf;"
| 47 || 23 || Colorado Avalanche || 4–3 OT || Pittsburgh Penguins || 26–16–5 || 57
|-  style="background:#fcf;"
| 48 || 25 || New York Rangers || 7–4 || Pittsburgh Penguins || 26–17–5 || 57
|-  style="background:#cfc;"
| 49 || 26 || Pittsburgh Penguins || 5–2 || Montreal Canadiens || 27–17–5 || 59
|-  style="background:#fcf;"
| 50 || 29 || Pittsburgh Penguins || 1–3 || Buffalo Sabres || 27–18–5 || 59
|-

|-  style="background:#cfc;"
| 51 || 1 || Phoenix Coyotes || 1–4 || Pittsburgh Penguins || 28–18–5 || 61
|-  style="background:#cfc;"
| 52 || 4 || Vancouver Canucks || 4–6 || Pittsburgh Penguins || 29–18–5 || 63
|-  style="background:#cfc;"
| 53 || 5 || Pittsburgh Penguins || 6–3 || Montreal Canadiens || 30–18–5 || 65
|-  style="background:#fcf;"
| 54 || 8 || Detroit Red Wings || 6–5 OT || Pittsburgh Penguins || 30–19–5 || 65
|-  style="background:#fcf;"
| 55 || 12 || New York Islanders || 5–1 || Pittsburgh Penguins || 30–20–5 || 65
|-  style="background:#fcf;"
| 56 || 15 || Pittsburgh Penguins || 1–5 || Philadelphia Flyers || 30–21–5 || 65
|-  style="background:#fcf;"
| 57 || 16 || Philadelphia Flyers || 6–2 || Pittsburgh Penguins || 30–22–5 || 65
|-  style="background:#cfc;"
| 58 || 18 || Florida Panthers || 2–4 || Pittsburgh Penguins || 31–22–5 || 67
|-  style="background:#fcf;"
| 59 || 22 || Chicago Blackhawks || 5–2 || Pittsburgh Penguins || 31–23–5 || 67
|-  style="background:#fcf;"
| 60 || 23 || Pittsburgh Penguins || 1–4 || New York Islanders || 31–24–5 || 67
|-  style="background:#fcf;"
| 61 || 27 || Pittsburgh Penguins || 1–4 || Detroit Red Wings || 31–25–5 || 67
|-

|-  style="background:#fcf;"
| 62 || 1 || Pittsburgh Penguins || 3–6 || New Jersey Devils || 31–26–5 || 67
|-  style="background:#fcf;"
| 63 || 4 || New Jersey Devils || 3–1 || Pittsburgh Penguins || 31–27–5 || 67
|-  style="background:#fcf;"
| 64 || 5 || Pittsburgh Penguins || 2–4 || Buffalo Sabres || 31–28–5 || 67
|-  style="background:#cfc;"
| 65 || 8 || Philadelphia Flyers || 2–3 OT || Pittsburgh Penguins || 32–28–5 || 69
|-  style="background:#ffc;"
| 66 || 10 || Montreal Canadiens || 2–2 OT || Pittsburgh Penguins || 32–28–6 || 70
|-  style="background:#ffc;"
| 67 || 12 || Pittsburgh Penguins || 5–5 OT || Phoenix Coyotes || 32–28–7 || 71
|-  style="background:#fcf;"
| 68 || 14 || Pittsburgh Penguins || 3–6 || Colorado Avalanche || 32–29–7 || 71
|-  style="background:#fcf;"
| 69 || 16 || Pittsburgh Penguins || 2–6 || Dallas Stars || 32–30–7 || 71
|-  style="background:#cfc;"
| 70 || 18 || Buffalo Sabres || 3–5 || Pittsburgh Penguins || 33–30–7 || 73
|-  style="background:#cfc;"
| 71 || 20 || Toronto Maple Leafs || 3–6 || Pittsburgh Penguins || 34–30–7 || 75
|-  style="background:#fcf;"
| 72 || 22 || New Jersey Devils || 3–2 || Pittsburgh Penguins || 34–31–7 || 75
|-  style="background:#fcf;"
| 73 || 24 || Pittsburgh Penguins || 0–3 || New York Rangers || 34–32–7 || 75
|-  style="background:#fcf;"
| 74 || 26 || Pittsburgh Penguins || 5–8 || Montreal Canadiens || 34–33–7 || 75
|-  style="background:#cfc;"
| 75 || 29 || Los Angeles Kings || 1–4 || Pittsburgh Penguins || 35–33–7 || 77
|-  style="background:#cfc;"
| 76 || 31 || Florida Panthers || 3–4 || Pittsburgh Penguins || 36–33–7 || 79
|-

|-  style="background:#ffc;"
| 77 || 3 || Hartford Whalers || 5–5 OT || Pittsburgh Penguins || 36–33–8 || 80
|-  style="background:#cfc;"
| 78 || 5 || Ottawa Senators || 2–5 || Pittsburgh Penguins || 37–33–8 || 82
|-  style="background:#cfc;"
| 79 || 8 || Boston Bruins || 1–3 || Pittsburgh Penguins || 38–33–8 || 84
|-  style="background:#fcf;"
| 80 || 10 || Pittsburgh Penguins || 3–4 || Tampa Bay Lightning || 38–34–8 || 84
|-  style="background:#fcf;"
| 81 || 11 || Pittsburgh Penguins || 2–4 || Florida Panthers || 38–35–8 || 84
|-  style="background:#fcf;"
| 82 || 13 || Pittsburgh Penguins || 3–7 || Boston Bruins || 38–36–8 || 84
|-

|- style="text-align:center;"
| Legend:       = Win       = Loss       = Tie

Playoffs 

|-  style="background:#fcf;"
| 1 || 17 || Pittsburgh Penguins || 1–5 || Philadelphia Flyers || 0–1
|-  style="background:#fcf;"
| 2 || 19 || Pittsburgh Penguins || 2–3 || Philadelphia Flyers || 0–2
|-  style="background:#fcf;"
| 3 || 21 || Philadelphia Flyers || 5–3 || Pittsburgh Penguins || 0–3
|-  style="background:#cfc;"
| 4 || 23 || Philadelphia Flyers || 1–4 || Pittsburgh Penguins || 1–3
|-  style="background:#fcf;"
| 5 || 26 || Pittsburgh Penguins || 3–6 || Philadelphia Flyers || 1–4
|-

|- style="text-align:center;"
| Legend:       = Win       = Loss

Player statistics 
Skaters

Goaltenders

†Denotes player spent time with another team before joining the Penguins. Stats reflect time with the Penguins only.
‡Denotes player was traded mid-season. Stats reflect time with the Penguins only.

Awards and records

Awards

Transactions 
The Penguins have been involved in the following transactions during the 1996–97 season:

Trades

Free agents acquired

Free agents lost

Lost via waivers

Other

Draft picks 

Pittsburgh Penguins' picks at the 1996 NHL Entry Draft.

Draft notes
 The New Jersey Devils' second-round pick (from San Jose Sharks) went to the Pittsburgh Penguins as a result of a June 22, 1996, trade that sent two second-round picks to the Devils in exchange for this pick.
 The Pittsburgh Penguins' second-round pick (from Toronto Maple Leafs) went to the New Jersey Devils as the result of a June 22, 1996, trade that sent a second-round pick to the Penguins in exchange for a second-round pick and this pick.
 The Pittsburgh Penguins' second-round pick went to the New Jersey Devils as the result of a June 22, 1996, trade that sent a second-round pick to the Penguins in exchange for a second-round pick and this pick.
 The Boston Bruins' third-round pick went to the Pittsburgh Penguins as a result of an August 1, 1995, trade that sent Kevin Stevens and Shawn McEachern to the Bruins in exchange for Glen Murray, Bryan Smolinski and this pick.
 The Pittsburgh Penguins' fifth-round pick went to the San Jose Sharks as the result of a March 20, 1996, trade that sent Kevin Miller to the Penguins in exchange for this pick.
 Compensatory pick received from NHL as compensation for free agent Joe Mullen.
 The Pittsburgh Penguins' sixth-round pick went to the St. Louis Blues as the result of a March 20, 1996, trade that sent J. J. Daigneault to the Penguins in exchange for this pick.
 The Pittsburgh Penguins' seventh-round pick (from NHL as compensation for free agent Kjell Samuelsson) went to the Edmonton Oilers as the result of a June 22, 1996, trade that sent Tyler Wright to the Penguins in exchange for this pick.
 The Pittsburgh Penguins' eighth-round pick went to the Ottawa Senators as the result of a March 1, 1996, trade that sent Dave McLlwain to the Penguins in exchange for this pick.

Farm teams 
The Johnstown Chiefs of the East Coast Hockey League finished last in the North Division with a 24–39–7 record.

The IHL's Cleveland Lumberjacks finished second in the Central Division with a record of 40–32–10. They defeated the Indianapolis Ice in the first round 3–1, then defeated the Orlando Solar Bears in the second round 4–1 before losing to the eventual Turner Cup champion Detroit Vipers, 4–1.

See also 
 1996–97 NHL season

References 
 Penguins on Hockey Database

Pittsburgh Penguins seasons
P
P
Pitts
Pitts